Public saunas can be found throughout the Netherlands and Flanders, both in major cities and in smaller municipalities. These saunas are called Sauna, Thermen, Thermae or Spa and can be regarded as public bathhouses. Since every Dutch and Flemish house has a bathroom these public saunas are a luxury, not a necessity.

Public saunas
There are around 200 public saunas in the Netherlands alone. Nearly 50 percent of all Dutch public saunas are located in the provinces of North Holland, South Holland and North Brabant. The sauna culture is not seasonal and these saunas are open year-round. Most saunas open later in the morning and close around 11:00 PM or midnight. Prices vary from just under €20 to just over €30. Some saunas will charge by the hour, but most saunas have fixed prices for a full day or part of the day. Massages and other body treatments and food and drinks are to be paid extra, usually at the end of the sauna day. In most saunas, one can also rent towels, slides and bath robes. For body treatments and massages it is the norm to make a reservation in advance. Usually the sauna rooms tend to be quite hot and dry compared to saunas in other cultures.

Age and gender
Public saunas are mixed gender in the Netherlands and Flanders.  Some saunas have a regular women-only (part of the) day. There are some saunas that have a minimum age limit between 12 and 16 on some or all days. There is a very small number of saunas that are men-only, though these usually have a sexual  setting, where as regular public saunas are by definition non-sexual.

Some sauna establishments allow children and people of all ages together. Some other saunas reserve special hours for children between 2 and 5 years and the usual minimum age limit, with saunas of lower temperature. Children are required to be potty trained, or sporadically in some establishments to wear a swim diaper, to be allowed in though and often a swimming certificate is obligated. Children under 2 years old are, for health concerns, not allowed in the heated areas. Children are most often required to be accompanied by an adult since peace and quietness is expected in the sauna area. Also children are more vulnerable to hypothermia and hyperthermia because of their smaller body proportions and to assure their safety in the cold bath and hot rooms a supervising adult is expected to be present at all times when using these. Pre-elementary school children may have not yet gotten their swimming certificates and require for that reason supervision when using the pools.
Some saunas allow for health concerns (hypo- and hyperthermia, vasodilation, tachycardia) no children under 12–16 years at all.

Sauna facilities
The Dutch public saunas offer each at least a shared hot shower area, a warm foot bath, several dry saunas of different temperature and humidity, a cold bath ("dunking" bath), a shared cold shower area with shower baths, salt scrubbing facilities, a hot water bath, a warm water bath (often with herbs), a swimming pool (both indoor and outdoor), a relax area (both indoor and outdoor) and a restaurant / diner / bar area. Usually the sauna rooms tend to be quite hot and dry.

Very often breastfeeding or pumping rooms and massages and other personal care treatments such as body and skin treatments are available. Often also a steam room is included. The water in the sauna might be spring water, though no hot springs are found in the Netherlands and Flanders.

Extra facilities that some saunas might offer are natural lakes, salt water baths, cold rooms or snow rooms, mud baths, infrared heating or whirlpools. Some of the largest saunas may also have theatrical or sport facilities, hairdressers, manicure, pedicure, waxing, tanning beds, physiotherapy, boutiques, hotel rooms, meeting rooms or a library.

Also most wellness centres have on offer healthy and balanced food. In addition, an increasing number of saunas are also meeting the needs of their customers for sustainable saunas, offering a back-to-nature experience with ‘natural’ and ‘organic’ treatments or facilities.

Sauna etiquette
Toilet rooms are always gender separated, but dressing and locker rooms are usually mixed gender. Keeping one's clothes or bathing suit on is forbidden. It is considered inappropriate and unsanitary, therefore it is good manners to undress. Nudity is the norm.

Because one uses the sauna naked, one brings at least one towel to sit on and one towel to dry oneself with before going to the restaurant area and at the end of the day. Sitting or lying in a dry sauna or on another dry surface without a towel under oneself is considered a faux-pas. When using the steam room or stone resting beds one will not put a towel under oneself but will clean the surface before and after use with water. 
There is a strong emphasis on hygiene, showers are expected when entering the facility, before using a relax room, bar or restaurant and any sweating or steam room, pool or bath, and after the use of the restroom.

The towels, flip-flops and bathrobes are not worn in the sweating rooms or in the steam rooms, but they might be used outside in the area for relaxing and when walking between the various facilities. The slides or flip-flops and bathrobe are obligated in the restaurant and bar area.

Cellphones and other devices with a camera are forbidden. Physical public displays of affection or sexual advances are frowned upon and will cause the perpetrator to be expelled from the sauna. Smoking is not allowed on the grounds or otherwise only in designated areas. Eating is not allowed in the bathing or sauna area, nor is shaving or tooth brushing allowed in the shared areas.

The staff of the sauna is commonly recognizable by wearing board shorts and shirts (usual with the company logo) when in the sauna area, and are often more fully dressed in the restaurant and bar areas.
Most saunas employ saunameesters (sauna masters), which are gentlemen or ladies who pour water on the stove on regular times during the day (pouring water on the heated stones, often fragranced with natural oils, and spreading heat by waving the air through the sauna). Also during the opgieting, they might serve out ice cubes to cool down and sometimes they serve out warm liquid honey to people to rub into their skin. Some people will bring their own honey or lotions. Practices may vary, depending on the personal preferences of the sauna master.

Sauna rituals
Upon entering the sauna complex one undresses in the shared dressing room and takes a warm shower with soap. After this shower one takes a warm foot bath for several minutes to acclimate the body to a warmer temperature by warming the blood. One sits on or wears a towel while doing this. When the body is well enough warmed, one enters the actual sauna and chooses a bench to sit or lie on. Less experienced sauna users will often take the lower benches to avoid the highest temperatures. One puts a towel under oneself and leaves the body uncovered. Wearing flip-flops, a towel or bathrobe is not allowed in the sauna itself. A saunameester might perform an opgieting on various times during the day. Visitors usually won't perform an opgieting by themselves and just sit or lay in the sauna when a saunameester is not available. A sauna session takes about 15–20 minutes. The door is expected to be closed as soon as possible when entering or leaving the sauna. Once an opgieting has started it is frowned upon to enter the sauna, since it will cause a reduction of heat when opening the door. Leaving the sauna during an opgieting is acceptable if to avoid becoming unwell. The drinking of water is not done in the sauna to prevent the available blood from flowing to the abdomen rather than to the head, which increases the chance of losing ones consciousness by vasodilation. After the sauna one will take a few minutes to walk in the outdoor area or cold / snow room to cool down somewhat. Sometimes small portions of fruit will be offered. After a few minutes outside the sauna one will submerse oneself in the cold bath or take a cold shower bath. When cooled down sufficient one usual uses the relax area to sleep or otherwise relax during which one may choose to wear a towel or bathrobe. Outside the actual sauna or steam room it is always acceptable to wear a bathrobe or towel and flip-flops. This ritual may be repeated several times during the day, starting with the warm showering each time, followed by the foot bath, actual sauna, cooling down and relaxing. A full sauna cycle takes at least 45–60 minutes. After each cycle one might also use the hot bath, salt scrub, massage facilities, swimming pool or bar and dining facilities. Before doing this, showers are also the norm.

Social aspects
Though known to cause a rise in the stress hormones due to hyperthermic stress, saunas are most usually perceived as a means for relaxation and for that reason considered healthy in the Netherlands and Flanders. 
It is also a common way of socializing and bonding with family or friends, but loud conversation and noisy behavior are not appreciated, especially not in the sweating room itself. In the Netherlands and Flanders sauna visits are used more for social binding and relaxation opportunity, rather than for spiritual of healing purposes as is common in the German language area.

It is common for people to visit the public saunas with their partner or friends, or with family members like (grand)parents, (grand)children, brothers and sisters. People might also visit saunas on their own. People of all ages visit the saunas and there is no emphasis placed on gender, age, body shape, disability, tattoos, or body hair.

Occasional some of these establishments offer also women-only or bathing suit times, or bathing suit optional hours for people who are less comfortable with mixed-gender nudity; Algemeen Dagblad reported in 2008 that women-only, bathing suit-required times are drawing Muslim women to the sauna.

Misconceptions
Foreigners who are not familiar with the Northern European sauna tradition sometimes wrongfully associate the public nudity and mixed gender in the sauna with sexual behaviour or mistake the saunas for brothels or sex clubs. There is no sexual aspect to Dutch and Flemish saunas though, and sexual behavior within the sauna is considered a taboo. The exception in this are the few men-only gay saunas. The bathclothes days or bathclothes optional days are very populair with the foreigners living or visiting Northern Europe.

Private saunas
The middle class and wealthier part of the population often have their own private sauna at home, indoors or in the backyard, which usually consists of just a sweating room and shower. These private saunas are commonly not used to replace visits to the public saunas but rather as a complement.

Other public saunas
Fitness clubs in the Netherlands and Flanders are always multigender. They often have very basic sauna facilities, which usually are gender separated since the locker rooms and showers in the fitness clubs are always shared but gender separated.

Though very uncommon, some public swimming pools (called zwembad) may have very basic shared sauna facilities. Since the public swimming pools do not allow nudity in the pool area, in these saunas bathing suits are often required. In public swimming pools the dressing rooms and showers are often shared but always gender segregated.

Some hotels and holiday parks are also offering sauna facilities, ranging between shared mixed saunas and saunas for private use.

History
In the Middle Ages washing the body regularly and taking baths was the norm among all layers of society in what is nowadays the Netherlands and Flanders and across the whole of Germanic Europe. Dirt was seen as a cause of epidemics and so until the end of the Middle Ages it was the habit among both men and women to wash regularly and have massages afterwards. People would louse each other in the public baths and wash themselves with ash and soap. In the countryside the public baths were probably as common as in the cities, though less luxurious.

The steam bath or sauna was already described in the villages and towns of Germanic territories in the 10th century. There would be a signboard with a bundle of sticks and leaves on the street. 
The course of events was as follows:
The sauna master blew his horn when the sauna opened.
Then the people could come inside, barefoot, without belt, with a shirt or robe on the arm.
In (caused by the vapor) semidarkness they lay on wooden benches around hot stones whereon regular water was sprinkled.
Masseuses or family members could massage the back, arms and legs. People lashed themselves with branches causing them to sweat and they rubbed themselves with soap and ashes.
The barber was available to cut hair and beards. Then the people would pull on their robes and lay down in the resting room next to the bath on a bed.

The public baths were for the common people: women, men and children. All ages and genders used the bathhouses. The men wore at most a kind of underpants. The women wore a linen tunic that fell open at the top or sides and neck, chest, arms and shoulders bare. Scented herbs were spread in the water. Hospitality commanded to provide for and invite guests to a bath.

The private baths were mainly for the nobility and the wealthy bourgeoisie. Above the private baths, galleries where placed where people could sit down to watch and talk. One did not necessarily have to stay in his own bath room but could also go to other areas to speak and join with other people of the same standing. The richer part of the visitors could eat in the water if they had paid for it at the entrance, there was a table that was covered in water. There were also musicians who sang in the water, accompanied by a zither. The wealthiest bathers could pay for rose petals to be spread in the water.

Bathhouses had a hot bath and a cold water bath to alternate between. Next to the baths were resting rooms. The bathhouses were described in medieval literature as a meeting place for lovers and as a place where eroticism could sprout. In reality, the public baths were strictly regulated and controlled to prevent promiscuity. 
According to Poggio Bracciolini visitors were quiet, they peeped not at each other, did not have dirty fantasies and spoke no oblique language. There was no hint of ambiguity. The atmosphere was cozy, cheerful and innocent. Young and old were together. The old, decrepit women not ashamed of their bodies withered and were not laughed at because people were not eyeing each other with lust.

Some people went three or four times a day to the bathhouse. Both in urban and rural areas were public baths. At the end of the medieval period in the 14th century people started to associate the public baths, and especially washing the body with water, with the spread of the plague. Some of the public baths were (medicinal) spa baths that were in use until the fifteenth century. The presumption that the water in the bathhouses caused the spread of disease caused the discouraging of the use of them by the public entirely at the end of the 16th century after the syphilis epidemics in Europe. The assumption arose that washing and bathing with water caused physical and mental diseases.

From the early modern period to the late eighteenth century, the etiquette – and medical textbooks – advised to just wash the parts of the body that were visible to the public, meaning the face, ears, neck, hands and feet. This is because it was thought that it bathing would remove the natural protective outer layer of the skin. 
Bathing was during the Renaissance mainly reserved for the sick – and then usually dressed in a shirt, and also further preferably in spring water.

In the seventeenth and eighteenth centuries in Europe began the Enlightenment. Philosophers developed new ideas about nature and doctors noticed the connection between lack of hygiene and disease, and the correlation of health with a good personal hygiene. Large public baths were revived in the nineteenth century. There were public baths and pools constructed again. Because of advancing wealth, progressive insights into hygiene, health and wellbeing, bathrooms with showers or baths, were built in all post-war homes. The function of and the need for public baths decreased again. After World War II, the sauna idea respread from Scandinavia across most European countries, but now primary as a way of socializing and relaxing rather than to wash oneself.
There are still bathhouses, but they are kept for travelers and reformed into or combined with saunas.

References

Dutch culture
Flemish culture
Public baths
Sauna